Kalateh-ye Meymari (also Romanized as Kalāteh-ye Meymarī; also known as Kohneh Shahr) is a village in Bala Jowayin Rural District, in the Central District of Jowayin County, Razavi Khorasan Province, Iran. According to a 2006 census its population was 1,438, in 368 families.

References 

Weblog

Populated places in Joveyn County